Örebro Syrianska IF is a Swedish football club from Örebro.

History 

1977 grew the first Syriac team in the Swedish sports movement. Örebro City became the first city to get a Syriac football club and is not much known. Football interests among people led to creating conditions for sports. The Örebro Syrianska was founded in the year 1977, just a few months earlier than its sibling association Syrianska FC Södertälje.

Those first eight years played Örebro Syrianska If the raven series for as recently as 1986 to take the leap for the first time in the history of Division 6. Unfortunately, there was a brief spell in Division 6 as the lack of planning was the reason the man had paid for only one season in Division 6th

But Örebro Syrianska IF never left him. The second attempt to league came in 1989 and it was a success. It managed to remain both sporting and economic terms.

The year 1993 was historic in several ways in Örebro Syrianska history when it advanced for the first time to Division 5. The following years were kept to remain for another season in Division 5. Mats Johansson was a success and wrote the story for Örebro Syrianska that ran across the resistance in Series 1994 and was able to salvage the series win of the Division 4 game. However, there was only two seasons in Division 4, and then plummet straight down the league system from Division 4 to Division 6th

The recovery came with the series victory in Division 6, 1999. Again, it was the following year to win the division 5 as a newcomer and from 2002 has been stamping in Division 4 which at best been very close to a kvalplats to Division 3 in 2005.

For the first time in history, Örebro Syrianska IF cope Division 3 after winning 2006 Series games in division 4 of gambling coach Melke Alan who showed the way to the Division 3rd

First year in Div. 3 Western Svealand 2007 was a success it ended up in 6th place. It managed to attract players from the famous football powers such as Brazil and Argentina.

Örebro Syrianska focused on advancement to Division 2 season 2008. This was an initiative that was extremely close to going home. It all started shaky and after the change of a trainer found the team shape and the game by playing the coaches Samuel Mokede and Nuri Aykal. This in turn, paved the way for a horror film in the series with the whole 5 teams involved in top battle. The whole thing was settled those last two rounds and unfortunately drew Örebro Syrianska nitlotten. Attributed to a fifth place, the compound is satisfied with the 2008 season, where it has established itself as a dangerous top teams.

2009 was the year when Hans Kallen and Peter Goransson led Örebro Syrianska in division three western Svealand. It ended with an honorable sixth place after a season of great plays turnover and a relatively young squad. Örebro Syrianska was halfway into the season in the top battle but slowed towards the end of the season.

For the season 2010, the team aims to advance up a notch in the league system. After a lead-vis sluggish season with the outgoing coach's reputation team up by Ossie Selimovic entered the club as head coach. With a few games left of the season stood Örebro Syrianska If the league of division three, but with an abysmal away games was enough results only for a qualifying nose where it will take on Spårvägens FF. Well in qualifying we made a stunning away game and took us 2–2 home Örnsro IP. But at home the other hand, as the red and yellow otherwise have been so strong they would travel on a disappointing 3–2 loss which meant further play in Division 3rd

A clear objective for the head coach Nuri Abrahamsson 2011 were advancing against Division 2 after 2010 edition when foals on the goal line. After some heavy acquisitions as sports committee enlisted, began to go on a high-class training camp to Turkey and Side to weld the last pre-season. The season started pretty well when it stood as league leaders in division three, but with an abysmal away games was enough results once more for a kvalplats where they will take on IK Huge. Once in kvalets first outstanding away from home they took with them 1–1 home Örnsro IP. But Örnsro crushed to IK Huge with the whole 3–0 and advance to the qualifying round 2. Falu FK was too difficult for Örebri Syriac in the first meeting of the two Örnsro IP. The match ended 0–1 and a big advantage now had Falu FK and with profit of Örnsro IP. Return The meeting could not be worse Dream of division two extinguished when Falu FK won with the whole 3–2 and continued play in division three.

A sad repeat of the previous season. So one can easily summarize 2012. It was said that 2012 would be something completely different from 2011. Then there was unfortunately not. With a fairly sharp economic crisis had to terminate all player contracts and coaching contracts and it led to the coach dropped out its mission. But it would not interfere with the sports, the players decided to set up and help the club. The season started pretty well when it stood as one of the winners of the third division but with an abysmal away games was enough results yet again for a kvalplats where they will take on Hille IF. Once in kvalets first outstanding at home they took with them 2–0 away from home thanks to the home results could advance to the qualifying round 2. For the third year in succession stumbled Örebro Syrianska the finish line in qualifying for Division 2. closing seconds away against Rotebro was extra painful. Rotebroleden equalized in the 97th minute to 2–2.

2013 Became an intermediate year for Örebro Syrianska and earned a placement in Division three.

2014 was a historic year after eight seasons in Division 3 was man after twenty rounds as serial winners of division three leading game to Division Two.

2020 - Örebro Syrianska finished in 12th position in the Division 1, with 34 league points after 9 wins, 7 draws and 14 loses during the season.

2021 - during the 2021 Division 1 season, Örebro Syrianska seemed to have a similar evolution compared to 2020, finishing in 11th spot.

2022 saw an improvement for Örebro Syrianska team, with 11 victories, 9 draws and 10 loses, completing the season in a comfortable 8th position in Swedish Division 1 (also known as Ettan Fotboll).

Organization 
Örebro Syrianska IF's organization is as follows:

√ Annual Meeting is the highest decision-making body.

√ The Board constitutes the highest
decision-making body between annual meetings.

√ Offices that make up the board's extended arm of the committee / committees, which is the main activity carried on.

√ committee / committees in which the main activity carried on.

External links 
Örebro Syrianska IF – official site

See also 
Assyrians/Syriacs in Sweden
List of Assyrian-Syriac football teams in Sweden

References 

Assyrian football clubs
Assyrian/Syriac football clubs in Sweden
Football clubs in Örebro County
Sport in Örebro
Association football clubs established in 1977
1977 establishments in Sweden